Wakefield Metropolitan District Council, also known as Wakefield Council, is the local authority of the City of Wakefield in West Yorkshire, England. It is a metropolitan district council and provides a full range of local government services including Council Tax billing, libraries, social services, processing planning applications, waste collection and disposal, and it is a local education authority. Wakefield is divided into 21 wards, electing 63 councillors. A third of the council is elected for three of every four years. The council was created by the Local Government Act 1972 and replaced the Wakefield City Council of the County Borough of Wakefield and several other authorities. Since 1974 Wakefield has held borough and city status and from this time would use the full title of the authority on all publications, signage, council vehicle fleet and documents, however from around 2005, like many other local authorities doing so at the time, the authority dropped the full title for the shorter Wakefield Council (although for an interim period when the new logo was unveiled, it would have the full authority title below however this has now been replaced with the strapline - 'working for you').

As of May 2019 the council is controlled by the Labour Party. The council leader has been Denise Jeffery since December 2019 and Andrew Balchin is the chief executive. Since April 2014 Wakefield Council is a constituent council of the West Yorkshire Combined Authority.

History
The council was formed by the Local Government Act 1972 as the Wakefield Metropolitan District Council. It replaced the existing Wakefield City Council that was the local authority of the County Borough of Wakefield. It also replaced Castleford Borough Council, Ossett Borough Council, Pontefract Borough Council, Featherstone Urban District Council, Hemsworth Urban District Council, Horbury Urban District Council, Knottingley Urban District Council, Normanton Urban District Council, Stanley Urban District Council, Wakefield Rural District Council, Hemsworth Rural District Council and Osgoldcross Rural District Council.

The current local authority was first elected in 1973, a year before formally coming into its powers and prior to the creation of the Metropolitan District of Wakefield on 1 April 1974. The council gained borough and city status and to annually appoint a Mayor of Wakefield.

It was envisaged through the Local Government Act 1972 that Wakefield as a metropolitan local authority would share power with the West Yorkshire County Council. The split of powers and functions meant that the West Yorkshire County Council was responsible for "wide area" services such as fire, ambulance and waste disposal with the district authorities responsible for "personal" services such as social care, libraries, education and refuse collection. This arrangement lasted until 1986 when Wakefield Metropolitan District Council gained responsibility for some services that had been provided by the West Yorkshire County Council. The Local Government Act 1985 directed the councils of West Yorkshire to form joint arrangements in order to deliver these functions.

Powers and functions

The local authority derives its powers and functions from the Local Government Act 1972 and subsequent legislation. For the purposes of local government, Wakefield is within a metropolitan area of England. As a metropolitan district council, Wakefield Metropolitan District Council provides most local government functions directly. It is a billing authority collecting Council Tax and business rates, it processes local planning applications, it is responsible for housing, waste collection and environmental health, it is a local education authority, responsible for social services, libraries and waste disposal.

Certain services are provided with the other local authorities in West Yorkshire. The council is represented on West Yorkshire Joint Services Committee (for trading standards, archives, archaeology and grants), West Yorkshire Fire and Civil Defence Authority, West Yorkshire Integrated Transport Authority and the West Yorkshire Police and Crime Panel. Wakefield Council has been a constituent member of the West Yorkshire Combined Authority since 2014.

Policies
In 2004 the district's extensive council housing was transferred to Wakefield and District Housing (WDH), a new independent housing association. Council houses account for around 30% of the district's housing.

Finances
Wakefield Metropolitan District Council is the billing authority for Council Tax, and collects a precepts on behalf of the West Yorkshire Police and Crime Commissioner and the West Yorkshire Fire and Civil Defence Authority.

Elections

Electoral arrangements
One third of the council is elected in three of every four years, followed by one year without elections. For the purpose of electing councillors, Wakefield is divided into 21 wards.

Political makeup
The current council composition is Labour 45, Conservatives 11, Independents 4, Liberal Democrats 3 following the 2022 local elections. The following changes have occurred since that election:

 Conservative group Leader Cllr Tony Homewood resigns to become Independent.
Conservative group Chief Whip Cllr Annemarie Glover resigns to become Independent.

2022 Vote Share (%) 
Combined vote share of wards from the 2022 United Kingdom local elections.

LAB = Labour. GRN = Green Party. LD = Liberal Democrats. Ind = Independent candidates. Oth = Others. CON = Conservative

Former Logos

References

External links
Wakefield Council
Labour Party in Wakefield
Conservative Party in Wakefield
UK Independence Party in Wakefield
Liberal Democrats in Wakefield
Green Party of England & Wales in Wakefield

 
Metropolitan district councils of England
Local education authorities in England
Local authorities in West Yorkshire
Billing authorities in England
Leader and cabinet executives
1974 establishments in England